Zita Rachel Bancouly (born 11 April 1983), known as Rachel Bancouly, is an Ivorian former footballer who played as a forward. She has been a member of the Ivory Coast women's national team.

International career
Bancouly capped for Ivory Coast at senior level during the 2010 African Women's Championship qualification and the 2012 African Women's Championship.

International goals
Scores and results list Ivory Coast's goal tally first

See also
List of Ivory Coast women's international footballers

References

1983 births
Living people
Ivorian women's footballers
Women's association football forwards
Ivory Coast women's international footballers